Gus Otto (born December 8, 1943) is a former American college University of Missouri, and professional football player.  A linebacker, he played for the American Football League's Oakland Raiders from 1965 through 1969 and for the NFL Raiders from 1970–1972.

See also
Other American Football League players

References

1943 births
Living people
American football linebackers
Missouri Tigers football players
Oakland Raiders players
American Football League All-Star players
University of Missouri alumni
Players of American football from St. Louis
American Football League players